Nathan Evans (June 24, 1804 – September 27, 1879) was a U.S. Representative from Ohio for two terms from 1847 to 1851.

Biography 
Born in Belmont County, Ohio, Evans was County clerk of Belmont County in 1827 and 1828. While there, he taught school and studied law. He was admitted to the bar in 1831 and commenced practice in Hillsboro, Ohio. He moved to Cambridge, Ohio, in 1832, and became mayor in 1841. He later served as prosecuting attorney of Guernsey County from 1842 to 1846.

Evans was elected as a Whig to the Thirtieth and Thirty-first Congresses (March 4, 1847 – March 3, 1851). He was not a candidate for renomination in 1850 and resumed his legal practice in Cambridge. Evans again served as mayor from 1855 to 1857, then as Common Pleas Judge from 1859 to 1864.

Evans then resumed his legal practice until his death in Cambridge on September 27, 1879. He was interred in South Cemetery.

Sources

External links 
 

1804 births
1879 deaths
People from Cambridge, Ohio
People from Belmont County, Ohio
Mayors of places in Ohio
County district attorneys in Ohio
Whig Party members of the United States House of Representatives from Ohio
19th-century American politicians